Gulliver may refer to:


Arts and entertainment
Lemuel Gulliver, the protagonist of Jonathan Swift's novel Gulliver's Travels
the title character of Brian Gulliver's Travels, a satirical BBC radio series
Gary Gulliver, the title character of The Adventures of Gulliver, a 1968 Hanna-Barbera television cartoon
Gulliver Toscanni, protagonist of Gulliver Boy, a Japanese anime series
Gulliver "Gully" Foyle, the protagonist of Alfred Bester's novel The Stars My Destination
Gulliver, a seagull and special character from the video game series Animal Crossing

Places
Gulliver Lake, a lake in the Upper Peninsula of Michigan, United States
Gulliver, Queensland, a suburb of Townsville, Australia
Gulliver River, New Zealand
Gulliver Nunatak, Graham Land, Antarctica

People
Gulliver (name), a list of people with the surname or given name

Other uses
Gulliver (building), Kyiv, Ukraine
Gulliver Schools, a group of private co-educational schools in Miami-Dade County, Florida